Bryan J. Sievers (born May 26, 1959) is an American farmer and politician.

Born in Davenport, Iowa, Sievers lived with his family in Stockton, Iowa. He graduated from Bennett High School. Sievers received his bachelor's degree from Iowa State University. Sievers lived in New Liberty, Iowa and was a farmer. Sievers served on the Bennett Community School Board. Sievers served in the Iowa House of Representatives from 2001 to 2003 and was a Republican. He then served in the Iowa State Senate from 2003 to 2005.

Notes

1959 births
Living people
Politicians from Davenport, Iowa
Iowa State University alumni
Farmers from Iowa
School board members in Iowa
Republican Party members of the Iowa House of Representatives
Republican Party Iowa state senators